De Aar also known as Maraisfontein is a town in the Northern Cape province of South Africa. It has a population of around 42,000 inhabitants.

It is the second-most important railway junction in the country, situated on the line between Cape Town and Kimberley. The junction was of particular strategic importance to the British during the Second Boer War. De Aar is also a primary commercial distribution centre for a large area of the central Great Karoo. Major production activities of the area include wool production and livestock farming. The area is also popular for hunting, although the region is rather arid. De Aar is also affectionately known as "Die SES" deriving its nickname from the six farms that have surrounded De Aar since the 1900s. 

In 1967 a petition was passed to rename the town Maraisfontein after a veteran named Karl Hendricks Marais who was a local inhabitant who served in the Second Anglo Boer War. However the petition was never passed, but is now stated as altnertavive name by the locals.

History  
De Aar was originally established on the Farm "De Aar." The name means "the artery", a reference to its underground water supply. 
The Cape Government Railways were founded in 1872, and the route that the government chose for the line to connect the Kimberley diamond fields to Cape Town on the coast, ran directly through De Aar. Because of its central location, the government also selected the location for a junction between this first railway line, and the other Cape railway networks further east, in 1881. In 1899 two brothers who ran a trading store and hotel at the junction, Isaac and Wulf Friedlander, purchased the farm of De Aar. Following the Anglo Boer War, the Friedlander brothers surveyed the land for the establishment of a town. The municipality was created a year later and the town's first mayor, Dr Harry Baker, was elected in 1907.

The South African Defence Force's 97 Ammunition Depot is located  outside of De Aar. This is a large facility, and includes 186 magazines and an internal railway system. The South African Army's School of Ammunition is also located at the facility.

Geography

Climate
De Aar has a climate of extremes – very hot in the summer (days and nights) and icy in the winter months.

Tourist attractions 
There are ancient Khoisan rock engravings on the Volksrust and Brandfontein farms. Additionally, there is a "Garden of Remembrance", which honours the British troops killed in the Anglo-Boer War. The town is also home to a major military ammunition dump. The DoD Ammunition Sub Depot De Aar is located about 2 km west of the town.
De Aar is famous amongst Paragliding & Hang-Gliding pilots worldwide as it holds 2 World records & some countries' National Distance records. De Aar was also the host to the XC World Series in 2008 and 2009.
During the summer months De Aar is home for several thousand Kestrels. Every evening the birds fill the sky above town and land in the big trees near the hospital just as the sun sets to spend the night.

Doornkloof Nature Reserve
Karoo Gariep Conservancy
Rolfontein Nature Reserve
Hamilton Jansen Tourism Officer, General Secretary and Founder of Tourism Committee of the broader Pixley Ka Seme Region. 2003
Members of the Tourism Committee: Hamilton Jansen General Secretary, Tony Rautenbach Chairperson, Nannie Fouche Treasurer, Desiree Pansi Public relations, Charlotte Klopper, Badsie Wienand, Ben Jacobs and Sam Mooi additional members.

Famous people
Olive Schreiner, author, lived in De Aar for a while, although her house has now been converted into a restaurant.
Clerans Olifant, Narysec participant from Department of Rural Development and Land Reform
Gerrit Badenhorst, Former Powerlifter, Professional Strongman, and South Africa's Strongest Man winner.

Coats of arms

Municipal (1)
By 1931, the De Aar municipal council had adopted a seal-like emblem depicting a railway locomotive and the motto Progressus semper surrounded by a circle inscribed "Munisipaliteit – Municipality – De Aar".

Municipal (2)
By 1952, the municipality had assumed a coat of arms depicting a railway locomotive above a ram's head.  The motto was on a riband below the shield.

Municipal (3)
This design was improved a few years later, and the new version was registered with the Cape Provincial Administration in November 1955. The arms were now : Or, a merino ram's head caboshed proper, a base barry wavy of four Azure and Argent; on a chief Argent a locomotive Sable (i.e. a golden shield displaying, from top to bottom, a black locomotive on a silver background, a ram's head on a golden background, and four wavy stripes alternately blue and silver).

Municipal (4)
An entirely new coat of arms was registered at the Bureau of Heraldry in March 1986. The arms were : Azure, a pale Argent; on a Chief Gules, a ram's head caboshed Argent, between two wheels Or (i.e. a blue shield with a silver stripe down the middle and, across the top, a red stripe displaying a ram's head between two golden wheels).  The crest was an heraldic fountain above a water bouget, and the motto was Semper progressus.

Gallery

See also
The South African Wine Initiative
De Aar railway station

References

External links 

 citypopulation.de – Populations in urban areas in South Africa.
 places.co.za – De Aar
 angelfire.com – About De Aar
 De Aar environs
 Substance abuse is rife in the Northern Cape

Populated places in the Emthanjeni Local Municipality
Karoo
Populated places established in 1903
1903 establishments in the Cape Colony